Kamel Kolsi is a Tunisian football manager.

References

Year of birth missing (living people)
Living people
Tunisian football managers
AS Marsa managers
Club Africain football managers
US Monastir (football) managers